Cyprian Lucar (1544–1611) was an English mechanician and author.

Life 

He was born in London in 1544. His grandfather was John Lucar of Bridgwater, Somerset. His father, Emanuel Lucar, was a member of the Merchant Taylors' Company.

Career 

He was admitted as a scholar of Winchester College in 1555, and became fellow of New College, Oxford, before 1564. In 1568 he entered Lincoln's Inn.

Bibliography 

His most well known works are:

References

External links
 oxforddnb.com
 thesaurus.cerl.org
 viaf.org

1544 births
1611 deaths
English writers